Judge Whipple may refer to:

Dean Whipple (born 1938), judge of the United States District Court for the Western District of Missouri
Lawrence Aloysius Whipple (1910–1983), judge of the United States District Court for the District of New Jersey